Michael G. Mulderrig (1931 – 4 June 2013) was an Irish Gaelic footballer. He played for club side Ballina Stephenites and also lined out at inter-county level with the Mayo senior football team.

Honours

Mayo
All-Ireland Senior Football Championship: 1950, 1951
Connacht Senior Football Championship: 1950, 1951, 1955

Connacht
Railway Cup: 1951

References

1931 births
2013 deaths
Sligo inter-county Gaelic footballers
Mayo inter-county Gaelic footballers
Connacht inter-provincial Gaelic footballers